The 2014 NWSL College Draft was the second annual meeting of National Women's Soccer League (NWSL) franchises to select eligible college players. It was held on January 17, 2014, at the NSCAA Convention in Philadelphia, Pennsylvania, and was open to the public.

Format
Draft order was determined by the final 2013 regular season standings.
The Houston Dash, the expansion team associated with the Houston Dynamo, then received the fifth pick in the first round, between the four teams that missed the 2013 playoffs and the four that made the playoffs, and first pick in the second and fourth rounds.  After the 2014 allocations were released, this was later updated to give Houston the second pick in the first round and the first pick in the third round.

Results

Key

Picks

Trades
Round 1:

Round 2:

Round 3:

Round 4:

Summary
In 2014, a total of 27 colleges had players selected. Of these, 15 had a player drafted to the NWSL for the first time: Denver, Duke, Georgetown, Illinois, Marquette, Mississippi State, Nebraska, Notre Dame, Ole Miss, Santa Clara, Texas Tech, USC, Villanova, Virginia Tech and West Virginia.

Schools with multiple draft selections

Selections by college athletic conference

Selections by position

References

See also
 List of NWSL drafts
 List of National Women's Soccer League draftees by college team
 2014 National Women's Soccer League season

National Women's Soccer League drafts
College Draft
NWSL College Draft
NWSL College Draft
Soccer in Pennsylvania
Sports in Philadelphia
Events in Philadelphia
NWSL College Draft